Hao Ting may refer to:
 Hao Ting (diplomat)
 Hao Ting (gymnast)